Karl (or Carl) Philipp Josef, Prince von Wrede (29 April 176712 December 1838) was a Bavarian field marshal. He was an ally of Napoleonic France until he negotiated the Treaty of Ried with Austria in 1813. Thereafter Bavaria joined the coalition.

Early life
Von Wrede was born at Heidelberg, the youngest of three children of Ferdinand Josef Wrede (1722–1793), created in 1791 1st Baron von Wrede, and wife, married on 21 March 1746, Anna Katharina Jünger (1729–1804), by whom he had two more children: Baroness Luise von Wrede (23 September 17489 February 1794), married to Philipp, Baron von Horn (died 1834); and Baron Georg von Wrede (8 December 17653 April 1843), married on 17 January 1808 to Julie Zarka de Lukafalva (1781Osen, 1 August 1847), by whom he had issue.

Early career
He was educated for the career of a civil official under the Electorate of the Palatinate government, but on the outbreak of the campaign of 1799 he raised a volunteer corps in the Palatinate and was made its colonel. This corps excited the mirth of the well-drilled Austrians with whom it served, but its colonel soon brought it into a good condition, and it distinguished itself during Kray's retreat on Ulm. At the Battle of Hohenlinden Wrede commanded one of the Palatinate infantry brigades with credit, and after the peace of Lunéville he was made lieutenant-general in the Bavarian Army, which was entering upon a period of reforms. Wrede soon made himself very popular, and distinguished himself in opposing the Austrian invasions of 1805.

Wrede was engaged in the campaign against Prussia, winning especial distinction in the Battle of Pułtusk. But the attitude of the French towards the Bavarian troops, and accusations of looting against himself, aroused the general's fiery temper, and both in 1807 and in 1809 outward harmony was only maintained by the tact of Maximilian, the king of Bavaria.

1809

In the War of the Fifth Coalition, he led the 2nd Bavarian Division in the VII Corps. He played an important part in the Battle of Abensberg on 20 April 1809. In the morning, he probed Joseph Radetzky's Austrian defense at Siegenburg. Unable to make headway, he marched his division north to Biburg and crossed the Abens River. From Biburg, he moved on Kirchdorf and attacked Frederick Bianchi's reinforced brigade. When the Austrians retreated, Wrede aggressively pursued them to Pfeffenhausen late that evening. He led the advance from Pfeffenhausen and was involved in the Battle of Landshut on 21 April, capturing 11 cannon. On 24 April, his division was defeated at the Battle of Neumarkt-Sankt Veit when Johann von Hiller counterattacked in superior force. After occupying Salzburg on 29 April, Wrede moved southwest against the Tyrolean Rebellion. He pushed back Tyrolean irregulars at Lofer on 11 May and defeated Franz Fenner's mixed regulars and Tyroleans at Waidring the next day. On 13 May, he played a major part in crushing the division of Johann Gabriel Chasteler de Courcelles in the Battle of Wörgl.

After the French defeat at the Battle of Aspern-Essling, Napoleon I of France called Wrede's division to Vienna as a reinforcement. At first, Wrede's division stood in reserve in the Battle of Wagram. In the afternoon of 6 July, the Bavarians were sent into battle in support of Jacques MacDonald's celebrated attack. In a successful charge on the village of Sussenbrunn, Wrede was grazed by a bullet. Fearing the wound was fatal, he told MacDonald, "Tell the Emperor I die for him. I recommend to him my wife and children." Seeing that Wrede's injury was minor, the French general smiled and replied, "I think that you will be able to make this recommendation to him yourself." The embarrassed general got up and continued to lead his troops.

Later career

The Bavarians were for several years the active allies of Napoleon, and Wrede led the Bavarian corps that fought in Russia in 1812. Just before the Battle of Leipzig in October 1813, he negotiated the Treaty of Ried between Austria and Bavaria, by which Bavaria switched sides. Wrede then fought with the allies against Napoleon. After Leipzig, he tried to block the French escape at the Battle of Hanau on 30 and 31 October. Upon seeing the Bavarian armies' opening dispositions at the battle, Napoleon is said to have said of Wrede, "I made him a count, but I couldn't make him a general." Wrede positioned his troops poorly and Napoleon smashed one of his wings, inflicting 9,000 casualties. In 1814 he was created prince and field marshal. Wrede represented Bavaria at the Congress of Vienna.

He died in Ellingen. Von Wrede was no doubt the leading Bavarian soldier of his day.

Family 

He married on 18 March 1795 Countess Sofie von Wiser (23 May 17717 May 1837), by whom he had eight children: 
 Princess Amalie Auguste von Wrede (15 January 179611 September 1871, buried in Oettingen), married in Hochaltingen on 31 August 1813 Johann Aloys III, Prince zu Oettingen-Oettingen and zu Oettingen-Spielberg (Oettingen, 9 May 1788Munich, 7 May 1855, buried in Oettingen), and had issue
 Carl Theodor, 2nd Prince von Wrede (8 January 179710 December 1871), married firstly on 26 December 1824 Countess Amalie von Thürheim (20 July 180130 October 1842), and had issue, and married secondly on 13 January 1844 Amalie Löw (24 February 181124 June 1879): 
 Princess Walburga Marie von Wrede (7 March 182630 December 1883), married on 6 November 1851 Sigismund, Count zu Boineburg (died 1882)
 Carl Friedrich, 3rd Prince von Wrede (Munich, 7 February 1828Ellingen, 22 December 1897), married in Tutzing on 28 July 1856 Countess Helene von Vieregg (Tutzing, 30 March 1838Pähl, 21 October 1913), and had issue: 
 Princess Juliane Karoline Anna Maria von Wrede (3 June 185729 January 1943), married on 14 July 1880 Otto, Baron von Hallberg zu Broich (died 1905)
 Princess Leopoldine Gabriele Anna von Wrede (3 May 186022 June 1937), unmarried and without issue
 Carl Philipp, 4th Prince von Wrede (Ellingen, 10 September 1862Munich, 16 August 1928), married in Prague on 19 November 1889 Princess Maria Anna von Lobkowicz (Prague, 24 December 1867Pähl, 6 May 1957), and had issue: 
 Princess Maria Helene Leonhardine Alexia Ludovica von Wrede (Ellingen, 14 September 1890Pähl, 28 June 1974), unmarried and without issue
 Princess Maria Sidonia (Zdenka) Leopoldine Leonhardine Melchiora von Wrede (Munich, 15 November 1892Munich, 21 July 1983), married at Castle Sandsee on 5 July 1921 Hans, Ritter und Edler Herr von Rauscher auf Weeg (Munich, 7 August 1889Munich, 28 November 1957)
 Princess Marie Gabrielle Leopoldine Leonhardine Paula Balthasara von Wrede (Ellingen, 25/26 June 1895Munich, 14 September/November 1971), married in Munich civilly on 20 and religiously on 21 March 1922 Prince Robert-Prosper d'Arenberg (Pesch-am-Rhein, 10 August 1895Munich, 24 February 1972), and had female issue
 Princess Maria Rosa Simone Bernhardine Kaspara Gregoria von Wrede (Ellingen, 14 November 1896Munich, 29 February 1920), married in Munich on 28 June 1919 Hans Ritter and Edler Herr von Rauscher auf Weeg (Munich, 7 August 1889Munich, 28 November 1957)
 Carl Joseph Maria Antonius Oskar Philipp Leonhard Melchior, 5th Prince von Wrede (Ellingen, 12 June 1899Märtensmühle, 3 May 1945, of wounds received in action in the Second World War on 30 April 1945), married as her first husband in Bad Warmbrunn on 17 July 1939 Countess Sophie Hedwig Maria Anna Schaffgotsch genannt Semperfrei von und zu Kynast und Greiffenstein (Bad Warmbrunn, 25 May 1916Weissenburg, 6 September 2008), and had issue: 
 Princess Anna Gabriella/Gabriele Maria Theresia Kaspara von Wrede (Pähl, 11 September 1940), married as his second wife in Ellingen on 15 October 1971 Archduke Rudolf of Austria, (Prangins, near Nyon, 5 September 1919Brussels, 15 May 2010, buried in Klein Muri), and had female issue
 Carl Friedrich Oskar Melchior, 6th Prince von Wrede (Pähl, 7 June 1942), married firstly in Munich on 26 July 1969 (divorced in 1989) Ingeborg Hamberger (Bad Feilenbach, 2 December 1944), and has issue, and married secondly in Pleinfeld on 9 September 1991 Eva Katharina Kovarcz de Kovarczfalva (Obervellach, 10 November 1945), without issue: 
 Princess Alexandra Elisabeth Sophie Maria Caspara von Wrede (Munich, 12 May 1970), married civilly in Frières on 27 March 1998 and religiously in Ellingen on 2 May 1998 Archduke Karl of Austria, (Katana, 5 November 1955), and has issue
 Prince Carl Christian Franz Ferdinand Melchior von Wrede (Munich, 6 November 1972), married civilly in Castle Ellingen on 14 June 2003 and religiously in Budapest on 12 July 2003 Countess Katalin Bethlen de Bethlen (Vienna, 20 September 1975), and has issue: 
 Princess Alicia Claire Eugenie Sophie von Wrede (Vienna, 7 December 2007)
 Prince Carl Nikolaus Franz Valentin Melchor von Wrede (Vienna, 29 January 2010)
 Prince Balint Alexis Philipp Gilbert Balthasar von Wrede (Vienna, 24 April 2012)
 Princess Sophie-Elisabeth Maria Balthasara von Wrede (Pähl, 16 January 1944), married in Ellingen on 17 August 1968 Tassilo de Garnerin de la Thuille, Count von Montgelas (Pähl, 2 April 1937)
 Princess Maria Ida Leonhardine Hedwig Mechtildis Balthasara von Wrede (Munich, 26 February 1909Anholt, 25 October 1998), married as his first wife in Munich on 19 July 1928 (divorced in 1948) Nikolaus Leopold  8th Prince zu Salm-Salm (Potsdam, 14 February 1906Anholt, 15 January 1988), and had issue
 Prince Oskar Eugen Friedrich Maria von Wrede (Munich, 20 May 1867Ellingen, 16 June 1953), unmarried and without issue
 Prince Otto Friedrich von Wrede (25 April 182914 February 1896), married on 24 September 1858 Ignatia von Mack (23 April 183712 November 1905), and had issue: 
 Princess Helene Ignatia Amalie von Wrede (Vienna, 18 September 1859Wallgau, 21 September 1935), married in Mondsee on 2 July 1879 Karl, Count von Almeida (Lisbon, 10 May 1846Munich, 21 Jul 1902)
 Princess Emma Sofie von Wrede (17 June 18317 January 1888), married on 5 June 1853 Wilhelm, Count von Tattenbach (died 1898)
 Prince Oskar Eugen von Wrede (23 September 18342 September 1907), married on 16 October 1873 Baroness Maria von Leitner (5 June 184817 July 1902), and had issue: 
 Prince Albin Oskar von Wrede (26 September 1874 – 1877/8)
 Prince Karl Friedrich Maximilian von Wrede (12 October 1875 – 1877/8)
 Prince Alfred Josef von Wrede (11 January 18369 January 1839)
 Prince Alfred Karl Johann Friedrich Georg von Wrede (2 July 18441 October 1911), married firstly on 19 September 1866 (divorced in 1883) Rosa von Mack (25 February 18317 January 1915), and had issue, and married secondly on 23 July 1884 Karola Köpatha de Nemes Kapus (11 July 184428 January 1926), without issue: 
 Princess Olga Alfreda Rosa von Wrede (25 July 18679 August 1938), married on 8 September 1885 Prince Alfred Lodzia Ponin-Poninski (died 1915)
 Prince Adalbert Alfred Friedrich Otto von Wrede (1868–1883)
 Prince Ignaz Christian Egon Friedrich von Wrede (9 February 18705 September 1945)
 Prince Josef von Wrede (27 September 180026 December 1871), married on 31 October 1836 Anastasia Petrowo-Solovovo (17 April 180825 December 1870), and had issue: 
 Prince Nikolaus von Wrede (Saint Petersburg, 26 December 1837Gmunden, 1 August 1909), married in Vienna on 15 June 1879 Countess Gabriele zu Herberstein (Graz, 3 December 1851Gmunden, 9 November 1923), and had issue: 
 Princess Gabrielle Therese Maria Pia Anastasia Olga von Wrede (Graz, 5 May 1880Lugano-Massagno, 18 May 1966), married in Vienna on 27 April 1907 Eduard, Count von Kielmansegg (Vienna, 17 February 1874Walshausen, 10 February 1941)
 Princess Maria Theresia Josefa von Wrede (Athens, 29 October 188119__), unmarried and without issue
 Princess Therese Maria Josefa Antonia Anna Ignatia Lydia von Wrede (Munich, 29 March 1893Gmunden, 6 February 1973), married in Gmunden on 21 October 1919 Ernst August, Baron von der Wense (Vienna, 28 May 1891Gmunden, 16 December 1942)
 Princess Olga von Wrede (born 14 January 1839), married on 1 May 1862 Karl, Baron von Simbschen (died 1865)
 Princess Anastasia von Wrede (Cerlenkow, 12 August 1840Wiener Neustadt, 28 December 1912), married in Graz on 30 May 1870 Friedrich Albrecht, Count zu Ortenburg (Mühlhausen, 3 October 1831Coburg, 28 August 1904), and had issue
 Prince Konstantin von Wrede (15 January 184230 December 1873), unmarried and without issue
 Prince Adolf von Wrede (23 July 1849September 1923), married firstly on 30 June 1892 (divorced in 1896) Ludmilla Maldaner (born 4 September 1861), without issue, and married secondly on 22 October 1896 María del Carmen de Alvear y Pacheco (16 September 18552 June 1926), without issue
 Prince Gustav Friedrich von Wrede (23 February 180213 April 1840), married on 19 May 1833 Contessa Maria Balsamo (27 September 180223 July 1841), and had issue: 
 Prince Johanna Adelaide von Wrede (28 July 183423 May 1915), married on 3 October 1860 Karl, Count von Wiser
 Princess Sofie von Wrede (26 September 183613 May 1849)
 Prince Eugen Franz von Wrede (4 March 18061 May 1845), married on 4 April 1835 Baroness Mathilde Therese von Schaumburg (13 September 181115 December 1887), and had issue: 
 Prince Edmund Karl von Wrede (14 January 18362 November 1890), unmarried and without issue
 Princess Bertha Amalie von Wrede (30 August 183719 September 1883), unmarried and without issue
 Prince Eugen Adolf von Wrede (Munich, 6 January 1839Munich, 18 October 1909), married in Schloss Weixelstein on 29 September 1875 Maria von Gutmansthal-Benvenuti (Odessa, 3 December 1852Munich, 30 May 1936), and had issue: 
 Prince Karl Ludwig Edmund Maria von Wrede (Pola, 15 September 1876Munich, 31 January 1947), married in Munich on 24 June 1930 Marie Alice Mayer (Lommeringen, 1 May 188619__), without issue
 Prince Edmund Alexander Nikolaus Maria von Wrede (Weixelstein, 21 August 1878Munich, 14 March 1963), married in Madrid on 20 May 1903 Edda de Benítez y Alvear (Buenos Aires, 3 November 1880Munich, 21 November 1958), and had issue: 
 Princess Carmen Adolfine Nicolette Elvira Dolores Elli Charlotte Maria von Wrede (Berlin, 28 March 1904Munich, 25 March 1994, buried in Bamberg), married civilly in Bayreuth on 7 September 1946 and religiously in Schloss Niederstotzingen on 24 September 1946 Prince Alexander Ernst August Ignaz Joseph zu Solms-Braunfels (Braunfels, 5 August 1903Munich, 8 October 1989, buried in Bamberg), without issue
 Princess Edda Maria Lydia Angeles Eugenia Adamsina Therese Edmunda von Wrede (Berlin, 28 March 1904Munich, 28 July 1985), married in Bayreuth on 2 April 1946 (divorced in 1961) Walter Burckhard (Strassburg, 19 February 190819__)
 Prince Edmund Philipp Josef Adam Karl Eugen Antonius Eustachius Maria von Wrede (20 September 1919k.a. in the Second World War, 22 June 1941), unmarried and without issue
 Princess Sofie Marie von Wrede (4 March 180621 June 1866), unmarried and without issue
 Princess Natalie Wilhelmine von Wrede (born 4 March 1809), unmarried and without issue
 Prince Adolf Wilhelm von Wrede (8 October 181027 July 1884), married on 24 April 1836 Desirée Grabowska (1 June 179916 November 1863), and had issue: 
 Prince Raoul Josef von Wrede (25 November 184319 October 1914), married Countess Marie Czapska (died 10 December 1873), without issue

Honours
He received the following orders and decorations:

Notes

References
 
 Arnold, James R. Crisis on the Danube. New York: Paragon House, 1990. 
 Arnold, James R. Marengo & Hohenlinden. Barnsley, South Yorkshire, UK: Pen & Sword, 2005. 
 Arnold, James R. Napoleon Conquers Austria. Westport, Conn.: Praeger Publishers, 1995. 
 Bowden, Scotty & Tarbox, Charlie. Armies on the Danube 1809. Arlington, Texas: Empire Games Press, 1980.
 Epstein, Robert M. Napoleon's Last Victory and the Emergence of Modern War. Lawrence, Kansas: University Press of Kansas, 1994.
 Petre, F. Loraine. Napoleon and the Archduke Charles. New York: Hippocrene Books, (1909) 1976.
 Smith, Digby. The Napoleonic Wars Data Book. London: Greenhill, 1998.

External links

1767 births
1838 deaths
Military personnel from Heidelberg
People from the Electoral Palatinate
Members of the Bavarian Reichsrat
Field marshals of Bavaria
Bavarian generals
Diplomats of Bavaria
Military leaders of the French Revolutionary Wars
German commanders of the Napoleonic Wars
Recipients of the Order of St. George of the Second Degree
Knights Grand Cross of the Military Order of William
Grand Crosses of the Military Order of Max Joseph
Honorary Knights Grand Cross of the Order of the Bath
Commanders Cross of the Military Order of Maria Theresa
Grand Crosses of the Order of Saint Stephen of Hungary
Grand Officiers of the Légion d'honneur
W